Milton is an unincorporated community in Rutherford County, Tennessee, United States. Its ZIP Code is 37118.  The community is concentrated in the northeast corner of the county along State Route 96 (Lascassas Pike) between Auburntown and Murfreesboro.

Milton was established by early-19th-century entrepreneur Gideon Thompson in 1820. Milton once was incorporated.

Notes

Unincorporated communities in Rutherford County, Tennessee
Unincorporated communities in Tennessee